Anatoly Savinsky (born 23 January 1986) is a retired Belarusian footballer. His latest club was Slavia Mozyr.

External links
 
 Profile at pressball.by
 

1986 births
Living people
Belarusian footballers
Association football goalkeepers
FC Slavia Mozyr players
FC Veras Nesvizh players
FC Rechitsa-2014 players
FC Vertikal Kalinkovichi players